S. Soundappan is an Indian politician who served twice as the Mayor of Salem. As a cadre of All India Anna Dravida Munnetra Kazhagam party, he previously served as Deputy mayor of the same Salem corporation from 2001 to 2006.
He won the Kalaimamani award for his excellence in service in the field of "Theater and Drama".

References 

All India Anna Dravida Munnetra Kazhagam politicians
Living people
People from Salem district
Mayors of places in Tamil Nadu
Year of birth missing (living people)
Mayors of Salem